In cricket, a batter reaches a century when he or she scores 100 or more runs in a single innings. A century is regarded as a landmark score for a batter, and their number of centuries is generally recorded in their career statistics. The Big Bash League (BBL) is a professional league for Twenty20 cricket in Australia, which has been held annually since its first edition in 2011–12. In the eleven seasons played, 32 centuries have been scored. Batters from all of the eight franchises have scored centuries.

The first century in BBL was scored in the second match on 17 December 2011 at Melbourne Cricket Ground, Melbourne by David Warner for Sydney Thunder against the Melbourne Stars. Of the 36 centuries, only five have been scored by overseas batters, i.e. non-Australians (two by Luke Wright, one by Chris Gayle, one by Alex Hales and one by Colin Munro), while 27 of those have been scored by Australian batters. Ben McDermott is the only player to have scored three BBL centuries, and Alex Carey, Craig Simmons, Usman Khawaja, Luke Wright, D’Arcy Short, Aaron Finch, Glenn Maxwell and Steve Smith are the only batters to score two centuries in the league's history.

	
As of 2022, the highest BBL score was made by Glenn Maxwell, who was Captain of the Melbourne Stars  (154 runs*, off 64 balls). Jake Weatherald is the only player to score a century in the final, he did so against the Hobart Hurricanes.

The below list includes all BBL centuries organised in a chronological order. Teams are initially listed in alphabetical order.

Key

Centuries

See also

 List of Big Bash League records and statistics

Notes

References

Centuries
BBL